Ars is a commune in the Creuse department in the Nouvelle-Aquitaine region in central France.

Geography

Population

Sights
 The church, dating from the thirteenth century.
 The ruins of the castle of Ars.
 A chapel, dating from the sixteenth century.

See also
Communes of the Creuse department

References

External links
 Ars on the Quid website 

Communes of Creuse